Royal Trux is the eponymously titled debut studio album by noise rock band Royal Trux. It was released in 1988 as an LP on Royal Records, then reissued in 1993 as a CD on Drag City.

Track listing

Personnel 
Credits adapted from liner notes.
 Neil Hagerty – vocals, guitar, percussion, production
 Jennifer Herrema – vocals, organ, percussion, production

References

External links 
 

1988 debut albums
Royal Trux albums
Drag City (record label) albums
Domino Recording Company albums